The first election to Armagh City, Banbridge and Craigavon Borough Council, part of the Northern Ireland local elections on 22 May 2014, returned 41 members to the newly-formed council via Single Transferable Vote. The Democratic Unionist Party won a plurality of seats, although the Ulster Unionist Party attracted the most first-preference votes.

Election results

Districts summary

|- class="unsortable" align="centre"
!rowspan=2 align="left"|Ward
! % 
!Cllrs
! %
!Cllrs
! %
!Cllrs
! %
!Cllrs
! %
!Cllrs
! %
!Cllrs
! %
!Cllrs
!rowspan=2|TotalCllrs
|- class="unsortable" align="center"
!colspan=2 bgcolor="" | DUP
!colspan=2 bgcolor="" | UUP
!colspan=2 bgcolor=""| Sinn Féin
!colspan=2 bgcolor=""| SDLP
!colspan=2 bgcolor="" | UKIP
!colspan=2 bgcolor="" | Alliance
!colspan=2 bgcolor="white"| Others
|-
|align="left"|Armagh
|9.6
|1
|19.3
|1
|bgcolor="#008800"|41.0
|bgcolor="#008800"|2
|26.8
|2
|2.1
|0
|1.2
|0
|0.0
|0
|6
|-
|align="left"|Banbridge
|23.8
|2
|bgcolor="40BFF5"|41.0
|bgcolor="40BFF5"|3
|12.3
|0
|14.5
|1
|0.0
|0
|5.1
|0
|3.3
|0
|7
|-
|align="left"|Craigavon
|bgcolor="#D46A4C"|25.4
|bgcolor="#D46A4C"|2
|21.7
|1
|22.5
|1
|15.1
|1
|0.0
|0
|4.7
|0
|10.6
|0
|5
|-
|align="left"|Cusher
|22.0
|1
|bgcolor="40BFF5"|38.4
|bgcolor="40BFF5"|2
|9.7
|0
|11.4
|1
|0.0
|0
|0.0
|0
|18.5
|1
|5
|-
|align="left"|Lagan River
|bgcolor="#D46A4C"|40.7
|bgcolor="#D46A4C"|3
|31.4
|2
|3.2
|0
|3.8
|0
|0.0
|0
|6.2
|0
|14.7
|0
|5
|-
|align="left"|Lurgan
|22.6
|2
|12.5
|1
|bgcolor="#008800"|35.8
|bgcolor="#008800"|3
|14.4
|1
|0.0
|0
|5.1
|0
|9.6
|0
|7
|-
|align="left"|Portadown
|bgcolor="#D46A4C"|32.7
|bgcolor="#D46A4C"|2
|19.4
|2
|16.7
|1
|8.7
|0
|7.8
|1
|2.0
|0
|12.7
|0
|5
|- class="unsortable" class="sortbottom" style="background:#C9C9C9"
|align="left"| Total
|24.6
|13
|26.1
|12
|21.0
|8
|14.0
|6
|1.8
|1
|3.4
|0
|9.1
|1
|41
|-
|}

District results

Armagh

2014: 2 x Sinn Féin, 2 x SDLP, 1 x UUP, 1 x DUP

Banbridge

2014: 3 x UUP, 2 x DUP, 1 x SDLP, 1 x Sinn Féin

Craigavon

Cusher

Lagan River

Lurgan

Portadown

* Incumbent

Changes during the term

† Co-options

‡ Changes of affiliation

Current composition: see Armagh City, Banbridge and Craigavon Borough Council.

References

2014 Northern Ireland local elections
21st century in County Armagh
21st century in County Down
21st century in County Antrim
Elections in County Antrim
Elections in County Down
Elections in County Armagh